Albert Stanislaus Gérard (1920-1996) was a Belgian scholar of comparative literature, specializing in African literature. His African Language Literatures was praised by Ngũgĩ wa Thiong'o as a "pioneering survey of literature in African languages".

Works
 L'idée romantique de la poésie en Angleterre. Étude sur la théorie de la poésie chez Coleridge, Wordsworth, Keats et Shelley, 1955. Translated as English romantic poetry : ethos, structure, and symbol in Coleridge, Wordsworth, Shelley, and Keats, 1968
 Four African literatures: Xhosa, Sotho, Zulu, Amharic, 1971
 (ed.) Black Africa, 1972
 African language literatures : an introduction to the literary history of Sub-Saharan Africa, 1981
 European-language writing in sub-Saharan Africa, 1985
 Contexts of African literature, 1990

References

1920 births
1996 deaths
Comparative literature academics
Belgian Africanists
Belgian literary critics
Scholars of African literature